Wolf Song is a 1929 American silent Western romance film directed by Victor Fleming and starring Gary Cooper and Lupe Vélez. Based on a story by Harvey Fergusson, the film is about a man who heads out west in 1840 looking for adventure and meets a group of mountain men who take him into the Rocky Mountains to trap beavers and cats. The man meets a beautiful Mexican woman in Taos who comes from a proud and wealthy family. They fall in love and elope, and he becomes torn between his love for her and his desire for travelin'. The film contains a synchronized score and sound effects, as well as some synchronized singing sequences. This Pre-Code film is notable for showing Gary Cooper almost entirely nude as he shaves and washes in a river.

Plot
Sam Lash (Gary Cooper) is a fur trapper with a randy reputation when it comes to women. But when Sam meets tempestuous Mexican damsel Lola Salazar (Velez), he falls deeply in love for the first time in his life. Lola's aristocratic father Don Solomon (Michael Vavitch) disapproves of the romance, forcing Sam to kidnap the girl and high-tail it to the mountains. After a brief period of marital contentment, Sam gets restless and leaves Lola, preferring the company of his trapper pals Gullion (Louis Wolheim) and Rube (Constantin Romanoff). But he relents and returns to his bride—making short work of his bitter enemy, Indian leader Black Wolf (George Rigas).

Cast

 Gary Cooper as Sam Lash
 Lupe Vélez as Lola Salazar
 Louis Wolheim as Gullion
 Constantine Romanoff as Rube Thatcher
 Michael Vavitch as Don Solomon Salazar
 Ann Brody as Duenna
 Russ Columbo as Ambrosio Guiterrez
 Augustina López as Louisa
 George Regas as Black Wolf
 Leone Lane as Dance hall girl
 Guy Oliver (uncredited)

Soundtrack
 "Love Take My Heart" (Arthur J. Lamb and A. Teres)
 "Mi Amado" (Harry Warren, Sam Lewis, and Joe Young)
 "Yo Te Amo Means I Love You" (Richard A. Whiting and  Al Bryan)

References

External links
 
 

1929 films
1929 Western (genre) films
1929 romantic drama films
American black-and-white films
American romantic drama films
Films directed by Victor Fleming
Paramount Pictures films
Transitional sound Western (genre) films
Silent American Western (genre) films
1920s American films
Silent romantic drama films
Silent American drama films